James Johnson Sweeney (1900–1986) was an American curator, and writer about modern art. Sweeney graduated from Georgetown University in 1922. From 1935 to 1946, he was curator for the Museum of Modern Art. He was the second director of the Solomon R. Guggenheim Museum, from 1952 to 1960. During his tenure, he expanded the scope of the collection to include abstract expressionist painting as well as sculpture, established the long term loans program in 1953, and the Guggenheim International Award in 1956. He was also involved in the final years of the construction of the Frank Lloyd Wright designed museum building during which time he had an antagonistic relationship with the architect.

Sweeney collected works by: Alexander Archipenko, Constantin Brâncuși, Alberto Burri, Alexander Calder, César, Alberto Giacometti, Lucio Fontana, David Hayes, Willem de Kooning, Fernand Léger, Joan Miró, Piet Mondrian, Pablo Picasso, Jackson Pollock and Pierre Soulages.

In the late 1960s, Sweeney was a consultant to the National Gallery of Australia during its establishment to advise on issues concerning the display and storage of art.  Subsequently, it also acquired paintings by Pollock and de Kooning.  The then Australian Prime minister, John Gorton apparently favoured him as the Gallery's first director, despite his age.  He also had significant input into its brutalist design.  According to the Gallery's first Director, James Mollison, "the size and form of the building had been determined between Colin Madigan and J.J. Sweeney, and the National Capital Development Commission.  I was not able to alter the appearance of the interior or exterior in any way...It's a very difficult building in which to make art look more important than the space in which you put the art".

Sweeney died April 14, 1986 in Manhattan.

References

1900 births
1986 deaths
American art curators
People associated with the Museum of Modern Art (New York City)
20th-century art collectors
Directors of museums in the United States